Gianni Marchetti (born 8 July 1956) is an Italian former professional tennis player.

Born in Jolanda di Savoia, Marchetti featured in the main draw of the 1976 Australian Open, where he lost his first round match in five sets to Teimuraz Kakulia. His other grand slam appearances came as a doubles player, at the French Open and Wimbledon. It was in doubles that he had the most success, winning a title at Palermo in 1982 with Enzo Vattuone, then reaching his best ranking of 97 in the world the following year.

Grand Prix career finals

Doubles: 1 (1–0)

Challenger titles

Doubles: (1)

References

External links
 
 

1956 births
Living people
Italian male tennis players